Ziyad Tariq Aziz Brisam  is a former Iraqi footballer who played as a defender for Al-Quwa Al-Jawiya, Al-Karkh, Al-Shorta and Al-Zawra'a. He also played for the Iraq national team.

Ziyad played in Al-Zawraa's 2000 Asian Cup Winners' Cup trail, and also came to the attention to a number of top Asian clubs in Al Zawraa's run to the 2000 Asian Cup Winners Cup' Final.

The defender, who like his father former Aliyat Al-Shurta player Tariq Aziz started out as a striker before he was switched to defence by coach Adnan Dirjal, while at Al-Quwa Al-Jawiya in 1993. He retired in 2006.

References

External links
 

Iraqi footballers
Iraq international footballers
2000 AFC Asian Cup players
Living people
1977 births
al-Quwa Al-Jawiya players
Al-Karkh SC players
al-Zawraa SC players
Al-Shorta SC players
Association football defenders